The Soviet Union maintained a system of foreign military bases against the United States during the Cold War.

Army bases 
At different times, various Soviet Army contingents were deployed in different regions of the world:

 In Eastern Europe:
 Northern Group of Forces (Polish People's Republic)
 Central Group of Forces (Austria, Hungary and Czechoslovakia)
 Group of Soviet Forces in Germany (German Democratic Republic)
 Southern Group of Forces (Romania and Hungary)
 Special Corps (Hungary; 1955—1957)
 Separate Mechanized Army (Romania; 1947—1958)
 North-West Group of Forces in the Baltic republics of the USSR (15 November 1991 until the collapse of the USSR)
 Limited Contingent of Soviet Troops in Afghanistan (The 40th Army under the command of the Turkestan Military District) from 1979 to 1989;
 Soviet Forces in Mongolia (under the command of the Transbaikal Military District)
5th Army (1921—1924)
17th Army (1940—1946)
39th Army (1945—1946; 1970—1992)
 39th Army in China (1945)
 Group of Soviet Military Specialists in China (1948—1961)
 Group of Soviet Military Specialists in Cuba
 Group of Soviet Military Specialists in Vietnam (1961—1991)

Naval bases

Air force

See also
 List of Russian military bases abroad
 List of United States military bases
 Lists of military installations

References

 
Bas